Secret Story is an album by Pat Metheny released in 1992 that won the Grammy Award for Best Contemporary Jazz Album in 1993.
All of the music is composed by Metheny (shared credit on one track), and it is one of his most ambitious studio ventures, integrating elements of jazz, rock, and world music. On the performing side, it includes collaborations with the Pinpeat Orchestra of the Royal Ballet of Cambodia, the London Orchestra and its conductor Jeremy Lubbock, the Choir of the Cambodian Royal Palace, legendary harmonica player Toots Thielemans, and keyboardist Lyle Mays from Pat Metheny Group.

Background 
The opening song, "Above the Treetops", is an adaptation of a Cambodian spiritual song; other pieces, such as "Antonia", take influence from Eastern Europe. Japanese pianist and singer Akiko Yano appears on "As a Flower Blossoms", earning the only co-writing credit on the album. Yano had previously collaborated with Metheny on "Good Girl", "Lots of Love", and "Love Life", from her 1991 album Love Life, and on two Metheny covers: "It's for You" on Welcome Back (1989) (which also featured Metheny performing on two additional songs) and "Praise" on Super Folk Song (1992). Orchestral arrangements for the album were conducted by Jeremy Lubbock.

Metheny took Secret Story on a concert tour, and a video recording of a live performance at New Brunswick, New Jersey, was issued. This film, also called Secret Story, was re-released on DVD in 2001.

The album was certified gold by the RIAA on December 1, 1995.

Reception 
AllMusic reviewer Thom Jurek awarded the album 4.5 stars.

Remaster
In September 2007, the album was released again with noticeably retouched mixes and a bonus CD of five previously unreleased tracks from the same sessions. The remaster was issued on WEA and Nonesuch Records.

Track listing

Note
Bonus CD of the 2007 Deluxe Edition reissue. The numbering for bonus disc tracks 2–4 in the booklet and on the packaging is wrong. The tracklist below is as the music is presented on disc.

Personnel 

 Pat Metheny – guitar, bass guitar, keyboards
 Armando Marçal – percussion (tracks 1–7, 9, and 12)
 Steve Rodby – double bass, bass guitar (tracks 4-7, 9, and 11)
 Paul Wertico – drums (tracks 4–5, 7–9, and 11)
 Naná Vasconcelos – percussion (tracks 1, 4–5, and 10–12)
 Steve Ferrone – drums (tracks 3–5, and 12)
 Will Lee – bass guitar (tracks 4, 6, and 12)
 Gil Goldstein – accordion (tracks 4, 7, and 9)
 Lyle Mays – piano, keyboard (tracks 2 and 6)
 Toots Thielemans – harmonica (tracks 8 and 11)
 Charlie Haden – double bass (tracks 1 and 8)
 Danny Gottlieb – cymbal roll, percussion (tracks 3 and 11)
 Mark Ledford – vocals (tracks 3 and 4)
 Ryan Kisor – trumpet, flugelhorn (track 9)
 Mike Metheny – trumpet, flugelhorn (track 9)
 Michael Mossman – trumpet, flugelhorn (track 9)
 Dave Bargeron – trombone, tuba (track 9)
 Tom Malone – trombone (track 9)
 Dave Taylor – bass trombone (track 9)
 John Clark – French horn (track 9)
 Andy Findon – flute (track 7)
 Skaila Kanga – harp (track 13)
 Anthony Jackson – contrabass guitar (track 9)
 Sammy Merendino – drums (track 6)
 Akiko Yano – vocals (track 10)

Technical 
 Pat Metheny – producer
 Steve Rodby and David Oakes – co-producers
 Mastered by Ted Jensen
 Recorded Fall-Winter 1991–92 at the Power Station, New York City
Orchestra recorded at Abbey Road Studio One, London, UK

Awards
Grammy Awards

References

Pat Metheny albums
1992 albums
Grammy Award for Best Contemporary Jazz Album
Geffen Records albums